Peter George Wellesley Graves, 8th Baron Graves (21 October 1911 – 6 June 1994) was an English actor.

Born in London, Graves was the son of Henry Algernon Claude Graves, 7th Baron Graves. Admiral Thomas Graves, 1st Baron Graves, was his great-great-great-grandfather. He was educated at Harrow School.

Biography
Known during his acting career as Peter Graves, he specialised in light comedies and musicals, often cast as dapper young men about town. His career peaked in the mid-to-late 1940s, beginning with the films of director/writer Val Guest, including Miss London Ltd. (1943) and Bees in Paradise (1944), opposite Arthur Askey; and Give Us the Moon (1944) and I'll Be Your Sweetheart (1945), opposite Margaret Lockwood. Other roles included the lead in Spring Song (1946), and George IV in both The Laughing Lady (1946) and Mrs. Fitzherbert (1947).

He also appeared in a number of films by Herbert Wilcox, such as the popular musicals Spring in Park Lane (1948) and Maytime in Mayfair (1949), both vehicles for Anna Neagle and Michael Wilding. He also portrayed another royal, Prince Albert, in both Wilcox's The Lady with a Lamp (1951) and Lilacs in the Spring (1954). He also appeared alongside Neagle on stage in the 1953 West End musical  The Glorious Days.

He re-emerged in the 1960s as a popular comic supporting player in several films, including Alfie, The Wrong Box (both 1966), The Jokers, I'll Never Forget What's'isname (both 1967), and The Magic Christian (1969). He continued acting until a few years before his death, mostly on television.

In 1963 he succeeded his father as eighth Baron Graves. However, as this was an Irish peerage it did not entitle him to a seat in the House of Lords.

He married Winifred Ruby Moule (better known as soprano singer Vanessa Lee, who played many leading roles, especially in several Ivor Novello musical comedies) on 28 May 1960. She died in 1992; their union had been childless. He died on 6 June 1994 in France, of a heart attack. He was succeeded in the barony by his second cousin Evelyn Paget Graves.

Selected filmography

 Lily Christine (1932)
 Kipps (1941)
 King Arthur Was a Gentleman (1942)
 Bees in Paradise (1944)
 Give us the Moon (1944)
 I'll Be Your Sweetheart (1945)
 Waltz Time (1945)
 The Laughing Lady (1946)
 Gaiety George (1946)
 Spring Song (1946)
 The Lady with a Lamp (1951)
 Derby Day (1952)
 The Admirable Crichton (1957)
 Alfie (1966)
 The Wrong Box (1966)
 The Jokers (1967)
 I'll Never Forget What's'isname (1967)
 How I Won the War - Staff Officer (1967)
 The Assassination Bureau (1968)
 The Magic Christian (1969)
 The Adventurers (1970)
 Paul and Michelle (1974)
 The Slipper and the Rose (1976)
 I Hired a Contract Killer (1990)

Arms

References

Kidd, Charles, Williamson, David (editors). Debrett's Peerage and Baronetage (1990 edition). New York: St Martin's Press, 1990.

External links
 

1911 births
1994 deaths
People educated at Harrow School
Barons in the Peerage of Ireland
English male stage actors
English male musical theatre actors
English male film actors
Male actors from London
20th-century English male actors
20th-century English singers
20th-century British male singers